Dare Vršič (born 26 September 1984) is a Slovenian footballer who plays for Zavrč as a midfielder. Besides Slovenia, he has played in Slovakia, Romania and Austria.

International career
Vršič was capped 13 times for the Slovenia national team. He made his debut on 2 June 2007 against Romania.

Career statistics

International
Scores and results list Slovenia's goal tally first, score column indicates score after each Vršič goal.

Honours

Club
Celje
Slovenian Cup: 2004–05
Žilina
Slovak Super Liga: 2006–07
Koper
Slovenian PrvaLiga: 2009–10
Austria Wien
Austrian Football Bundesliga: 2012–13
Maribor
Slovenian PrvaLiga: 2013–14, 2014–15, 2016–17, 2018–19
Slovenian Cup: 2015–16
Slovenian Supercup: 2014

Individual
Slovenian PrvaLiga top scorer: 2011–12

References

External links

NZS profile 

1984 births
Living people
Sportspeople from Maribor
Slovenian footballers
Association football midfielders
Slovenian PrvaLiga players
Slovak Super Liga players
Liga I players
Austrian Football Bundesliga players
Slovenian Second League players
NK Mura players
NK Celje players
MŠK Žilina players
FC Politehnica Timișoara players
FC Koper players
NK Olimpija Ljubljana (2005) players
FK Austria Wien players
NK Maribor players
NK Triglav Kranj players
Slovenian expatriate footballers
Slovenian expatriate sportspeople in Slovakia
Expatriate footballers in Slovakia
Slovenian expatriate sportspeople in Romania
Expatriate footballers in Romania
Slovenian expatriate sportspeople in Austria
Expatriate footballers in Austria
Slovenia youth international footballers
Slovenia under-21 international footballers
Slovenia international footballers